Concept-based image indexing, also variably named as "description-based" or "text-based" image indexing/retrieval, refers to retrieval from text-based indexing of images that may employ keywords, subject headings, captions, or natural language text (Chen & Rasmussen, 1999). It is opposed to Content-based image retrieval. Indexing is a technique used in CBIR.

Chu (2001) confirms that there exist two distinctive research groups employing the content-based and description-based approaches, respectively. However, research in the content-based domain is currently dominating in the field, while the other approach has less visibility.

See also
Document classification
Subject (documents)

References

 Ahmad, K., M. Tariq, B. Vrusias and C.Handy. 2003. Corpus-based thesaurus construction for image retrieval in specialist domains. In Sebastiani, F. (ed.). Proceedings of the 25th European Conference on Information Retrieval Research (ECIR-03). 502–510. Heidelberg: Springer Verlag.
 
 Angeles, M. (1998). Information Organization and Information Use of Visual Resources Collections. VRA Bulletin, 25 (3), 51-58. 
 
 Chen, H.-L., & Rasmussen, E.M. (1999). Intellectual access to images. Library Trends, 48(2), 291–302.
 
 Chu, H. T. (2001). Research in image indexing and retrieval as reflected in the literature. Journal of the American Society for Information Science and Technology, 52(12), 1011-1018. 
 
 Fidel, R.; Hahn, T. B.; Rasmussen, E. M. & Smith, P. J. (1994). Challenges in Indexing Electronic Text and Images. Medford, NJ: Learned Information. (ASIS Monograph Series) 
 
 Heidorn, P. B. & Sandore, B. (Eds.). (1997). Digital Image Access & Retrieval: Proceedings of the 1996 Clinic on Library Applications of Data Processing. Illinois: University of Illinois, Graduate School of Library and Information Science. 
  
 Jörgensen, C. (2003). Image Retrieval. Theory and Research. Lanham, Maryland: Scarecrow Press. 
  
 Landbeck, C. R. (2002). The organization and categorization of political cartoons: An exploratory study. The Florida State University, School of Information Studies. (Master of Science thesis).  https://web.archive.org/web/20120331122537/http://etd.lib.fsu.edu/theses/available/etd-06272003-144515/unrestricted/crl01.pdf
 
 Lamy-Rousseau, F. (1984). Classification des images, materiels et donnees = Classification   of   images, materials and data . 2nd ed. Longueuil, Quebec: F. Lamy-Rousseau.
 
 Panofsky, E. (1962). Studies in Icology: Humanistic themes in the art of the Renaissance. New York: Harper & Row.
 
 Rasmussen, E. M. (1997). Indexing images. Annual Review of Information Science and Technology, 32, 169-196.
 
 Shatford, S. (1986). Analyzing the Subject of a Picture: A Theoretical Approach. Cataloging and Classification Quarterly, 6(3), 39-62.
 
 Wang, J. Z. (2001). Integrated Region-Based Image Retrieval. Boston, MA: Kluwer Academic Publishers. Book review: http://www-db.stanford.edu/~wangz/project/kluwer/1/review.pdf
 
 Wang, Xin;  Erdelez, Sanda; Allen, Carla; Anderson, Blake; Cao, Hongfei & Shyu, Chi-Ren (2011). Role of Domain Knowledge in Developing User-Centered Medical-Image Indexing. Journal of the American Society for Information Science and Technology, early view October 2011. 
 
 Warden, G.; Dunbar, D.; Wanczycki, C. & O'Hanley, S. (2002). The Subject Analysis of Images: Past, Present and Future. https://web.archive.org/web/20080726185732/http://www.slais.ubc.ca/PEOPLE/students/student-projects/C_Wanczycki/libr517/homepage.html
 
 Ørnager, S.  (1997). Image retrieval - Theoretical analysis and empirical user studies on accessing information in images. Proceedings of the ASIS annual meeting, 34, 202-211.

Index (publishing)